Chinese socialism may refer to:

Ideology of the Chinese Communist Party, history of the ideology of the current governing party of China
Socialism with Chinese characteristics, current ideology of the Chinese Communist Party
Socialist market economy, form of socialist economy in China today
Socialist ideology of the Kuomintang, from the period of the Republic of China before 1949